The 1954 World Freestyle Wrestling Championship were held in Tokyo, Japan.

Medal table

Team ranking

Medal summary

Men's freestyle

References
FILA Database

World Wrestling Championships
International wrestling competitions hosted by Japan
FILA
World Championships
World  Wrestling  Championships
World  Wrestling  Championships